Jacqueline Andrée Naze Tjøtta (1 June 1935 – 9 March 2017) was a Norwegian mathematician who became the first female mathematical sciences professor in Norway.

Jacqueline Naze was born in Montpellier, France, to musician Maurize André Naze and Renée Marie Courbet. She graduated in mathematics from the Aix-Marseille University and Sorbonne, Paris. She married Norwegian mathematician Sigve Tjøtta in 1964. She was appointed professor in applied mathematics at the University of Bergen from 1966. Her research interests focused on kinetic theory, magnetohydrodynamics and theoretical acoustics.

She died in Oslo on 9 March 2017 at the age of 81.

References

1935 births
2017 deaths
Scientists from Montpellier
Aix-Marseille University alumni
College of Sorbonne alumni
French emigrants to Norway
French women mathematicians
Norwegian women mathematicians
Academic staff of the University of Bergen